Kellon Alexis (born 19 November 1992) is a Grenadian athlete who specializes in throwing events. In 2014 he set a National Record  in the Hammer Throw with a distance of 54.22 m. He also set a record in the men's Weight throw with a distance of 17.06m.

On 20 January 2017, he further improved the national record with a throw of 17.34m at the MSSU OPEN at the Missouri Southern State University. On 28 January he further improved on his Personal Best and the National Record with a throw of 18.01 meters at the Pittsburg state invitational. Kellon's Record breaking season would continue with a Hammer Throw of 56.51m at the Bobcat Twilight in San Marcos, Texas on 21 April. He also went on to receive all regional honors in Discus, Hammer and Javelin throw in that season.

Competition record

References

External links

1992 births
Living people
Grenadian male athletes